Horace P. Holden, Jr. (born May 24, 1963 in Atlanta, Georgia) is an American slalom canoer who competed in the mid-1990s. He finished 11th in the C-2 event at the 1996 Summer Olympics in Atlanta.

References
 Sports-Reference.com profile

1963 births
American male canoeists
Canoeists at the 1996 Summer Olympics
Living people
Olympic canoeists of the United States
Sportspeople from Atlanta